Thomas Dillon O'Brien (February 14, 1859 – September 3, 1935) was an American lawyer, judge, and academic from Minnesota. He was one of the five co-founders of William Mitchell College of Law and a justice of the Minnesota Supreme Court.

Biography
O'Brien was born in the Wisconsin town of La Pointe, on Madeline Island on February 14, 1859. At the age of four, he and his family moved to St. Paul, Minnesota. He read law with a local practitioner and was admitted to the state bar in 1880. He began his legal career as the Clerk of St. Paul's Municipal Court. In 1885, he was appointed Assistant City Attorney. In 1891, he sought and won election as Ramsey County Attorney, although he only served for one term.

In 1900, along with Hiram F. Stevens, Ambrose Tighe, Moses Clapp, and Clarence Halbert, he founded William Mitchell College of Law's first predecessor school, the St. Paul College of Law. He taught there for most of that decade.

From 1905 to 1907, O'Brien served as the state Insurance Commissioner. In September 1909, Governor John Albert Johnson appointed him to be an associate justice of the Minnesota Supreme Court. O'Brien left the court in 1911 and returned to private practice. He later served as the dean of the St. Thomas College of Law, until its dissolution in 1933.

He died in St. Paul on September 3, 1935, and was buried there at Calvary Cemetery.

Notes

1859 births
1935 deaths
Politicians from Saint Paul, Minnesota
People from La Pointe, Wisconsin
Minnesota lawyers
Justices of the Minnesota Supreme Court
Mitchell Hamline School of Law